Álvaro Corral Echazarreta (born 30 May 1983) is a Spanish former professional footballer who played as a central defender, and is the current physical therapist of CD Tudelano.

Playing career
Born in Logroño, La Rioja, Corral spent his first decade as a senior in Segunda División B, starting with CD Aurrerá de Vitoria in 2002 and going on to represent CD Recreación de La Rioja, Zamora CF, CF Palencia, UE Sant Andreu, Águilas CF, CD Izarra and CD Mirandés. He also competed briefly in Tercera División, having played the first part of the 2009–10 season with CD Alfaro.

Corral featured in 26 matches (more than 2,100 minutes of play) in the 2011–12 campaign, as Mirandés promoted to Segunda División for the first time in its history. He made his debut in the competition on 1 September 2012, playing the full 90 minutes in a 4–0 away win against Xerez CD. His first goal was scored on 15 March 2014, in the 2–0 victory at Deportivo Alavés.

In the summer of 2016, after 162 competitive appearances at the Estadio Municipal de Anduva (97 in the second tier), the 33-year-old Corral returned to the lower leagues with CD Tudelano.

Coaching career
Corral retired in January 2019, being immediately appointed team physio at his last club.

References

External links

1983 births
Living people
Sportspeople from Logroño
Spanish footballers
Footballers from La Rioja (Spain)
Association football defenders
Segunda División players
Segunda División B players
Tercera División players
Logroñés CF footballers
Zamora CF footballers
CF Palencia footballers
UE Sant Andreu footballers
CD Izarra footballers
CD Mirandés footballers
CD Tudelano footballers
CD Aurrerá de Vitoria footballers